Running Out of Time 2 (literal title:Hidden War 2) is a 2001 Hong Kong crime caper film co-directed by Johnnie To and Law Wing-cheung. It is a sequel to To's 1999 film Running Out of Time, with Lau Ching-wan returning as Inspector Ho Sheung-sang, who this time has to go after an elusive thief played by Ekin Cheng.

Synopsis
The film brings back Inspector Ho Sheung-sang (Lau Ching-wan), this time to contend with another clever thief (Ekin Cheng, whose character is nameless). This time around, the thief is determined to extort money from a high-strung businesswoman (Kelly Lin) and play a few rounds of clever games with Ho in the process.

Cast
 Lau Ching-wan - Inspector Ho Sheung Sang
 Ekin Cheng - The thief
 Kelly Lin - Teresa 
 Hui Shiu-hung - Superintendent/Assistant Commander Wong Kai-fat 
 Lam Suet - Ken
 Ruby Wong - Madam

Awards
Golden Horse Film Festival
 Won: Best Action Choreography (Bruce Mang)
 Won: Best Film Editing (Law Wing-cheung and Yau Chi-wai)
 Nominated: Best Visual Effects (Stephen Ma)
 Nominated: Best Sound Effects
 Nominated: Best Cinematography (Cheng Siu-Keung)

Hong Kong Film Critics Society Awards
 Won: Film of Merit Award

External links 
 

2001 films
2001 directorial debut films
2000s Cantonese-language films
Hong Kong crime films
2000s crime films
Hong Kong heist films
China Star Entertainment Group films
Milkyway Image films
Films directed by Johnnie To
Films directed by Law Wing-cheung
Films with screenplays by Yau Nai-hoi
2000s Hong Kong films